Citizen Pinoy is a television program that airs every Sunday on The Filipino Channel (TFC). It is hosted by immigration attorney Michael J. Gurfinkel and Filipino TV personality Gel Santos-Relos. The program specializes in helping the Filipino community deal with immigration problems from here in North America all the way back to the Philippines. The show has featured many people who have dealt with problems in becoming an American citizen from the common and Filipino celebrities.

The Filipino Channel original programming
Filipino-language television shows